"Capua" tetraplasia is a species of moth of the family Tortricidae. It is found in Australia, where it has been recorded from Queensland.

The wingspan is about 11 mm. The forewings are whitish, with a small basal patch and four ferruginous fasciae, mixed with fuscous. The hindwings  are grey.

Taxonomy
The species does not belong in the genus Capua and should be placed in a new genus.

References

External links
 Australian Moths Online on CSIRO

Moths described in 1916
Archipini